"Till the Next Goodbye" is a song by the English rock band the Rolling Stones, featured on its 1974 album It's Only Rock 'n Roll.

Credited to Mick Jagger and Keith Richards recording on "Till the Next Goodbye" began at Munich's Musicland Studios in November 1973. The song is a traditional ballad from the Stones' middle period, with slight country music influences. It opens with an acoustic guitar which leads into Jagger's performance. The lyrics deal with the "illicit meetings between two lovers";

The song's chorus is notable as the title is elongated into the phrase "Till the next time we say goodbye."

{{cquote|''Yeah, a movie house on 42nd Street, Ain't a very likely place for you and I to meet; Watching the snow swirl around your hair and around your feet; And I'm thinking to myself 'she surely looks a treat}}

 Recording and release 
Recording continued at Jagger's home in Newbury with the use of the Rolling Stones Mobile Studio and finished at Island Recording Studios in London. Jagger, Richards and Mick Taylor each perform acoustic guitar for the piece. Taylor also contributes electric slide guitar to the recording. Nicky Hopkins performs the song's piano. Bill Wyman performs bass while Charlie Watts performs drums.

An overlooked song from the Stones canon of work, "Till the Next Goodbye" has never been performed live by the Stones and was not included on any compilation albums until the release of the Heartbreak EP in early 2021.

The song was rehearsed on 11 February 2014 in Paris, in preparation for the Rolling Stones 14 On Fire Asia Pacific Tour, which started in Abu Dhabi on 21 February 2014. In attendance was special guest Mick Taylor.

Critical reception
In his review of the song, Bill Janovitz says, "In the mid-'70s, a 42nd Street movie theater would have been a place of questionable repute and not a very romantic rendezvous. The lyric is unexpectedly complex; the point of view, Jagger as narrator, speaks to the mistress apologetically and with a guilty conscience... In one line on the bridge, Jagger manages to convey empathy, culpability, and frustration: 'I can't go on like this/Can you? Can you?' On paper it seems clear, the narrator is asking out of the relationship (paraphrasing): 'I can't do this, can you?' But the way Jagger sings it, it sounds like he's asking, 'You can't do this anymore, can you?' He's conveying a different meaning altogether, almost as if he is playing both parts in one line."

In a period review, Rolling Stone's Jon Landau considered the song "almost poignant", noting how it "conveys [Jagger's] desperation by simply saying, 'I can't go on like this,' while the band smolders beneath him." This view was shared by Ernie Santosuosso, who wrote for The Boston Globe that the track was "one of the rare ballads", which cast Jagger "as a romantic"; Santosuosso also noted how the lyrics rest "upon a comfortable cushion of acoustic guitars and Nicky Hopkins's piano." Bill Provick of The Ottawa Citizen considered "Till The Next Goodbye" to be one of the album's two best tracks, noting how its acoustic number was "captivating with a charming blend of guitar, piano and percussion, plus Jagger's evocative vocals." Jack Lloyd of Knight Newspapers considered the track to be a "first-rate example of what the Stones can do when they are in top form."

In a retrospective review, Vulture's David Marchese ranked the song as the 189th best Rolling Stones song and called it "a fine attempt to repeat the country-ballad magic of "Wild Horses" ".

 Personnel 
According to authors Philippe Margotin and Jean-Michel Guesdon's book The Rolling Stones All the Songs, except where noted:The Rolling Stones Mick Jagger – lead vocals; lead acoustic guitar; writer
 Keith Richards – backing vocals; slide guitar; writer
 Mick Taylor – 12-string acoustic guitar
 Bill Wyman – bass
 Charlie Watts – drumsAdditional musicians and production Nicky Hopkins – piano
 The Glimmer Twins – producer
 Andy Johns – sound engineer
 Keith Harwood – sound engineer
 George Chkiantz – sound engineer
 Tapani Tapanainen – assistant sound engineer
 Rod Thear – assistant sound engineer
 Howard Kilgour – assistant sound engineer
 Reinhold Mack – assistant sound engineerStudio locations'''
 Musicland Studios, Munich (14-25 November 1973)
 Rolling Stones Mobile Studio, Stargroves (Newbury; 12 April-2 May 1974)
 Island Studios (London; 5-27 May 1974)

Notes

References

External links
Complete Official Lyrics

Songs about parting
The Rolling Stones songs
1974 songs
Songs written by Jagger–Richards
Song recordings produced by Jagger–Richards
Music videos directed by Michael Lindsay-Hogg